Henderson Hall may refer to:

United States:

 Henderson Hall (Arlington, Virginia), a U.S. Marine Corps facility near the Pentagon
 Henderson Hall (Canton, Missouri), listed on the National Register of Historic Places in Lewis County, Missouri
 Henderson Hall (Cookeville, Tennessee), listed on the NRHP in Putnam County, Tennessee
 Henderson Hall Historic District (Williamstown, West Virginia), listed on the NRHP in Wood County, West Virginia

England:

 Henderson Hall, residence hall at Newcastle University in Newcastle upon Tyne
 Henderson Hall, legal recruitment firm based in London

See also
Henderson House (disambiguation)

Architectural disambiguation pages